The Caruthers House is a historic house in Yuma, Arizona. It was built in 1895 for F. B. Logan and was extensively remodeled in 1906. It was purchased by  C. E. Eichelberger in 1900, and by E. G. Caruthers in 1906. The latter was a banker. The house was designed in the American Craftsman architectural style. It has been listed on the National Register of Historic Places since December 7, 1982.

It is also a contributing building in the Yuma Century Heights Conservancy Residential Historic District.

References

National Register of Historic Places in Yuma County, Arizona
Houses completed in 1895